The Alizée discography is the discography of the French recording artist Alizée consisting of six studio albums, seventeen singles and five promotional singles; all the released singles have a music video associated with them.

Alizée's range of musical genres and style includes pop, world, rock, house, electronica among others.  She became well known through her participation in the Granies de Star show. Her increased popularity led to a contract with Mylène Farmer and Laurent Boutonnat, her ex-mentors signing a contract with Polydor Records a division of Universal Records. Her debut single, "Moi... Lolita", was released in 2000 and topped the French Single Charts and was successful in many countries including the UK, Germany, Japan, Italy, Spain and others. Jacotey's first studio album, Gourmandises (2000), was released shortly after. The album was highly successful, earning a two times platinum certification in France and platinum in Europe selling to 2002 plus of one million records worldwide. The album was nominated for the Album of the Year honour at the Victoires de la Musique. The follow-up singles—"L'Alizé", "Parler tout bas" and "Gourmandises"— repeated her success; "L'Alizé" peaked at number one on the SNEP being certificated platinum in France.

In 2003, Alizée's second major release, Mes courants electriques, saw a genre shift for her, having more of an electropop and rock feel, rather than the soft synthpop and chanson influences of the first one, including English versions of four songs. The album debuted at number two in the French Albums Chart, and was heavily promoted in the Asian market, certificating gold twice in France, becoming very successful in Japan, South Korea, China and other charts. The first single from it, "J'en ai marre!", also debuted at number four rising to the next spot on the French Singles Chart, where it remained for nine consecutive weeks. Other singles include "J'ai pas vingt ans", another top twenty single in France both also released in English versions to appeal to the English-speaking market, "A contre-courant", which became her third single of the album, peaked at 22 in the French Singles Charts and also charted in Belgium and Switzerland.

In 2004 promoting her first tour, a video of the song "Amélie m'a dit" was released, for the promotion of Alizée's live album Alizée En Concert, even though it was not released as a single; for its promotion, a video of the song featuring a collection of clips from Alizée's performances during her tour were used.

After a three-year hiatus, a time spent out of the media limelight, Alizée returned in 2007 with a new album, Psychédélices, the first one to be made without the creative supervision of her former mentors, the first single extracted from the album was "Mademoiselle Juliette", officially released in September 2007, the single reached the number four in Belgium (Wallonia) charts, twenty two in French Singles Chart, it also peaked in Russian singles charts, "Fifty-Sixty" was released as the album's second and last international single in February peaking at number 23 in Flanders, Belgium, the cover version of La Isla Bonita was released just for France being very successful in the country reaching number eight, finally the album was released on December of the same year, the album was not considered a total commercial success in France compared with her last albums, where it reached 2nd place on the download charts and 16th place on the physical album sale charts. The album was more successful in Mexico peaking the number 15 in the albums chart and the number one in the international albums chart, also certified gold in Russia, Mexico and her native France selling plus of 200,000 copies worldwide.

In 2010 was released Une enfant du siècle, an album praised by critics, but commercially failure reaching the 24 spot in the French Albums Chart.

Released in March 2013, Alizée's fifth studio album, 5 received the acclaim from the critics, still with a continuous promotion including their two first extracts "À cause de l'automne" and "Je veux bien".

Albums

Studio albums

Live albums

Compilation albums

Singles

As lead artist

As featured artist

DVD releases

Other appearances

References

Discographies of French artists
Pop music discographies
Discography